Hypertrace is the debut studio album by the German power metal band Scanner, released through Noise Records in 1988. It is a concept album with a science fiction storyline.

Story 
During World War II, the military ordered the formation of a commando troop out of seven convicts. With scientific help these seven were trained and genetically manipulated to become a super combat unit.

The mutant soldiers went berserk, and directed all their strength and superior skills against their commanders. The rebels had to be annihilated ("Grapes of Fear"), so they were shot into space, and their rockets exploded, except one ("Locked Out"), which was found by aliens ("Wizard Force"). The aliens taught the mutant survivor to bring peace to the world ("Retaliation Positive").

Track listing 
All lyrics by Michael Knoblich. Music as indicated

 "Warp 7" (Tom S. Sopha, Axel Julius, Martin Bork, Michael Knoblich) – 4:27
 "Terrion" (Julius) – 4:53
 "Locked Out" (Julius) – 6:23
 "Across the Universe" (Julius, Bork, Knoblich) – 3:52
 "R.M.U." (Sopha, Julius, Bork, Knoblich) – 5:46
 "Grapes of Fear" (Julius, Sopha, Knoblich) – 3:58
 "Retaliation Positive" (Julius, Bork, Knoblich) – 4:25
 "Killing Fields" (Sopha, Julius, Bork, Knoblich) – 4:23
 "Wizard Force" (Sopha, Julius) – 4:25 (CD release bonus track)
 "Galactos" (Sopha, Julius, Bork, Knoblich)  – 3:45 (Japanese release bonus track)

Track #10, "Galactos" is only available on the Japanese re-release and the metal sampler Doomsday News vol.1.  According to Axel Julius, the band's only remaining original member, "Galactos" was not included on the original release because it was recorded during a different recording session and has a noticeably different sound when compared to the other songs on the album. The song was featured as track one on Noise's 1988 Doomsday News compilation.

The songs as arranged on the album are not in conceptual or chronological order. The correct conceptual order reported in the CD booklet is as follows:
 "Grapes of Fear"
 "Locked Out"
 "Across the Universe"
 "Wizard Force"
 "Retaliation Positive"
 "Galactos"
 "Warp 7"
 "Killing Fields"
 "R.M.U."
 "Terrion"

Personnel 
Band members
Michael Knoblich (M.A.J.O.R.) – vocals
Tom S. Sopha – guitars
Axel Julius (A.J.) – guitars
Martin Bork – bass guitar
Wolfgang Kolorz – drums

Guest musicians
Ralf Scheepers — additional vocal on "Locked Out"

Production
Frank Bornemann – producer
Tommy Newton – engineer, mixing
Bernd Schmidt, Ralf Krause – engineers

References 

1988 debut albums
Scanner (band) albums
Concept albums
Noise Records albums
Alien invasions in music